James Russell Brashears (March 13, 1858 – August 19, 1917) was an American lawyer, politician, and judge, a member of the Maryland House of Delegates and Maryland State Senate.

Biography
Born in Anne Arundel County, Maryland, Brashears attended West River Academy and studied law under his father. He was admitted to the bar in 1887. Politically, he was a Democrat. In 1889, he was elected to the Maryland House of Delegates, and thrice re-elected. During his fourth term, he was chairman of the Judiciary committee.  In 1907, he was elected to the Maryland State Senate. In 1908, he left the senate when he was appointed as a judge in the Fifth Judicial Circuit Court by Governor Crothers, a position he was re-elected to and held until his death. He died at home in Annapolis in 1917.

References

Democratic Party members of the Maryland House of Delegates
Maryland state court judges
Democratic Party Maryland state senators
1858 births
1917 deaths
Politicians from Annapolis, Maryland
19th-century American judges
19th-century American lawyers